Brezovec is a village and municipality in  Snina District in the Prešov Region of north-eastern Slovakia.

History
In historical records the village was first mentioned in 1600.

Geography
The municipality lies at an elevation of 290 metres and covers an area of 3.427 km². It has a population of 17 people.

Genealogical resources
The records for genealogical research are available at the state archive "Statny Archiv in Presov, Slovakia"

 Roman Catholic church records (births/marriages/deaths): 1783-1895 (parish B)
 Greek Catholic church records (births/marriages/deaths): 1833-1929 (parish B)

See also
 List of municipalities and towns in Slovakia

References

External links
https://web.archive.org/web/20071116010355/http://www.statistics.sk/mosmis/eng/run.html
Surnames of living people in Brezovec

Villages and municipalities in Snina District
Zemplín (region)